Nupserha punctata is a species of beetle in the family Cerambycidae. It was described by Karl Jordan in 1894.

Varieties
 Nupserha punctata var. seminigripennis Breuning, 1950
 Nupserha punctata var. parterufiventris Breuning, 1950

References

punctata
Beetles described in 1894